"The Golden Path" is a song recorded by English electronic music duo the Chemical Brothers, taken from their first greatest hits album, Singles 93–03. Featuring the Flaming Lips, the lead vocals were performed by Wayne Coyne with Steven Drozd performing backing vocals. The song reached number 10 in Spain, number 17 in the United Kingdom, number 20 in Ireland, and number 32 in Italy.

Production
Coyne said: "I love that band; they are one of the greatest inventions of our day." Coyne recalls about the recording process of his band's vocals: "We recorded our part very quickly, almost flippantly, like we'd get a second chance. Then Tom and Ed left a message within 20 minutes of receiving the tape. You could hear them jumping up and down in the background, shouting 'We're ecstatic.'"

Critical response
Choosing it as one of album's best tracks, John Bush from AllMusic said the song "delivers on most of its promise as a soundclash for two of neo-psychedelia's most interesting acts" while calling it "a cool, crisp song" with two surprises: its reminiscence of Echo & the Bunnymen and Drozd's vocal debut.

More critical was Michaelangelo Matos of Spin, cited the track as possible evidence for a Chemical Brothers "decline into middlebrow irrelevance."

Music video
The video was the first directorial work by American artist Chris Milk, involves a man (played by Fran Kranz) in a depressing grey office environment, dreaming of a more colorful world full of joy and dancing in the sunshine.

The Chemical Brothers make a brief cameo appearance as conjoined twins commemorated on a wall of "employee of the month" plaques.

Track listings
CD single
 "The Golden Path" – 4:47
 "Nude Night" – 6:18
 "The Golden Path"  – 6:35

DVD single
 "The Golden Path" 
 "The Golden Path" 
 "Dexter's International Scribble mix"
 "The Golden Path" 

12-inch single
 "The Golden Path" – 4:47
 "Nude Night" – 6:18

Charts

Release history

References

2003 singles
2003 songs
Astralwerks singles
The Chemical Brothers songs
The Flaming Lips songs
Music videos directed by Chris Milk
Songs written by Ed Simons
Songs written by Steven Drozd
Songs written by Tom Rowlands
Songs written by Wayne Coyne
Virgin Records singles